{{Infobox political party
| colorcode        = #2EA2E2
| name             = Kirchnerism
| native_name      = Kirchnerismo
| logo             = 
| caption          = Néstor Kirchner (left) and Cristina Fernández de Kirchner (right) served as Presidents of Argentina from 2003–2007 and 2007–2015.
| founder          = Néstor Kirchner
| leader           = Cristina Fernández de Kirchner
| foundation       = 
| ideology         = 

Kirchnerism is an Argentine political movement based on populist ideals formed by the supporters of Néstor Kirchner and his wife Cristina Fernández de Kirchner, who consecutively served as Presidents of Argentina. Although considered a branch of Peronism, it is opposed by some factions of Peronists and generally considered to fall into the category of left-wing populism.

Although originally a section in the Justicialist Party, Kirchnerism later received support from other smaller Argentine political parties (like the Communist Party or the Humanist Party) and from factions of some traditional parties (like the Radical Civic Union and the Socialist Party). In parties which are divided along Kirchnerist/Anti-Kirchnerist lines, the members of the Kirchnerist faction are often distinguished with the letter K (for instance "peronistas/justicialistas K", "radicales K" or "socialistas K") while the anti-Kirchnerist factions, those opposing Kirchnerism, are similarly labelled with the expression "anti-K".

Cristina Fernández de Kirchner has been sentenced by the Argentine justice for corruption and robbery to the Argentine state.

Characteristics

Both Kirchner and Fernández come from the left-wing of Peronism and both began their political careers as members of the Peronist Youth (Juventud Peronista). Many of the Kirchners' closest allies belong to the Peronist left. Anti-Kirchnerists often criticize this ideological background with the term setentista ("seventies-ist"), suggesting that Kirchnerism is overly influenced by the populist struggle of the 1970s.

Initially, Kirchnerism has shown itself to be concerned with the defense of human rights, particularly in prosecuting those who committed human rights violations during the Dirty War and were later made immune from prosecution by the governments of Carlos Menem (1989–1999). The willingness of the Kirchner government to revoke these immunities has led many Argentine pressure groups, such as the Madres de Plaza de Mayo and Abuelas de Plaza de Mayo, to take an actively Kirchnerist position. This has led to many controversies and to allegations that the Kirchners were never fully committed to human rights, especially during the period of the last military dictatorship, and that it was only when Kirchner became President and began to make alliances with the left-wing parties in Congress and with the Madres de Plaza de Mayo that he started to campaign about these rights in order to promote his own platform and gain popular favor. It is documented nevertheless that the Kirchners did push for trial against human rights violators during the dictatorship, although late in that period in 1983, when its end was already in sight.

Economically, Kirchnerism has pursued an economic policy of industrialist developmentalism. Tariffs protect local industry and employment.

Internationally, Kirchnerism has strongly supported Mercosur and vice versa, to the point that the President of Mercosur, Carlos Álvarez, is a Kirchnerist.
One of the most prominent aims of Kirchnerism is to strengthen Argentine relations with the countries of Latin America and to establish a South American economic axis. Recent economic measures posited by Fernández's government have nevertheless hurt Argentina's relationship with these countries, mainly Brazil and Uruguay, whose President José "Pepe" Mujica expressed worries regarding Argentina going towards an "autarkist" form of government and the Kirchnerist economic model "complicating relationships and multiplying difficulties" in bilateral commerce.

Kirchnerism, in particular former minister of health Ginés González García, has shown a liberal attitude to birth control and sexuality, including the legalization of same-sex marriage, both of which have provoked the opposition of the Catholic Church and other conservative sectors.

Ideology

Five economic tenets
According to Alberto Fernández, the Chief of the Cabinet of Ministers during the first five years of Kirchnerism and currently serving as President of Argentina, they followed five tenets regarding the economy, which explained the perceived early success of the movement:
 "Take no measures that increase the fiscal deficit"
 "Take no measures that increase the trade deficit"
 "Accumulate reserves in the central bank"
 "Keep the exchange rate very high to stay competitive and favor exports"
 "Pay off the external debt and do not acquire new debt"
According to Fernández, Cristina Fernández de Kirchner moved away from these five tenets after her husband's death, causing an economic crisis that resulted in the first political defeat of Kirchnerism in a presidential election in 2015. In the presidential election of 2019, Kirchnerism returned to power with the election of Alberto Fernández as President and Cristina Kirchner as Vice President. In the 2021 legislative elections on 14 November 2021, the Frente de Todos lost its majority in Congress for the first time in almost 40 years in midterm legislative elections. The election victory of the center-right coalition, Juntos por el Cambio (Together for Change), meant a tough final two years in office for President Alberto Fernandez. Losing control of the Senate made it difficult for him to make key appointments, including to the judiciary. It also forced him to negotiate with the opposition every initiative he sends to the legislature.

Transversalism

Unlike his predecessor Eduardo Duhalde, Kirchner was a Peronist that distrusted the Justicialist Party as a support for his government. He proposed instead a "transversalist" policy, seeking the support of progressive politicians regardless of their party. Thus he got support from factions of the Justicialist Party, the Radical Civic Union (which were called "Radicales K") and small centre-left parties.

Kirchner neglected the internal politics of the Justicialist Party and kept instead the Front for Victory party, which was initially an electoral alliance in his home province of Santa Cruz and in the 2003 elections premiered in the federal political scene. Some politicians favored by this policy were Aníbal Ibarra, mayor of Buenos Aires for the Broad Front and supported as Kirchnerist; and Julio Cobos, governor of Mendoza for the UCR and elected as Vice President of Fernández de Kirchner in 2007.

Decline 
The transversalist project was eventually dismissed. Kirchner took control of the Justicialist Party and some "Radicales K", slowly returned to the "anti-K" faction of their party, most notably Vice President Julio Cobos and Governor of Catamarca province Eduardo Brizuela del Moral, while other very prominent Radical politicians remained in the "K" wing of the Radical Civic Union such as provincial governors Gerardo Zamora of Santiago del Estero, Ricardo Colombi of Corrientes and Miguel Saiz of Río Negro. After the 2011 general elections, several K radicals regretted having been part of that political space, turning once again to the opposition UCR. Such is the case of Miguel Saiz, former governor of Río Negro, who declared: "My commitment to the Concertación ended in December 2011".

Resurgence 
In March 2015, dissatisfied with the UCR's alliance with Mauricio Macri's Republican Proposal (PRO), the National Alfonsinist Movement (MNA) led by Leopoldo Moreau joined the Front for Victory. For this reason, Ernesto Sanz, the president of the UCR, announced the expulsion of Moreau from the party. Professor Gustavo Melella was reelected as mayor of the city of Río Grande in 2015, through the FORJA Concertación Party. During the presidency of Alberto Fernández, Ricardo Alfonsin was appointed as the Ambassador to Spain.

Election results

Presidency

Chamber of Deputies

Senate

Criticism
Kirchnerism has encountered opposition from various sectors of Argentine society, which tend to criticize its personalism.<ref>[http://www.pagina12.com.ar/diario/elpais/1-20180-2003-05-16.html Néstor Kirchner y Cristina Fernández con la Legrand: “Yo completaré mi mandato”, Página/12, 16 de mayo de 2003].</ref>

In 2012, there was a massive anti-Kirchnerism protest in several cities within Argentina and also in several Argentinian embassies around the world. It became known as 8N.

In 2015, when Foreign Policy was discussing corruption in Latin America it was stated that: The viceroys of the colonial era set the pattern. They centralised power and bought the loyalty of local interest groups. [...] Caudillos, dictators and elected presidents continued the tradition of personalising power. Venezuela's chavismo and the kirchnerismo of Ms Fernández are among today’s manifestations. In an editorial published in October 2015, The Economist'' expressed the following view about the situation in Argentina: Argentina needs change. As Ms Fernández slips out of office the economy is starting to crumble. Currency controls and trade restrictions [...] are choking productivity; inflation hovers at around 25%. [...] Argentina cannot seek external financing until it ends its standoff with creditors who rejected a debt-restructuring plan. Unless the new president quickly reverses Ms Fernández’s populist policies, a crisis is inevitable"

See also

Argentine nationalism
Conflict between Kirchnerism and the media
La Cámpora
Left-wing populism
Peronism
Plural Consensus
Politics of Argentina
Public image of Cristina Fernández de Kirchner

References

Bibliographies
Rosendo Fraga (2010) Fin de ciKlo: ascenso, apogeo y declinación del poder kirchnerista, Buenos Aires, Ediciones B.

External links
 Kirchnerism launches its own syndical movement, Clarín, February 12, 2006
 Practical guide to the complexities of Kirchnerism, by Diego Schurman, Página/12, February 12, 2006
 When and how will Kirchnerism be defeated?, by Mariano Grondona in La Nación, August 26, 2007.
 The battle for common sense: the road to a kirchnerist hegemony? by Raquel San Martín in La Nación, April 18, 2011

 
Political movements in Argentina
Centre-left ideologies
Cristina Fernández de Kirchner
Néstor Kirchner
Justicialist Party
Eponymous political ideologies
Left-wing ideologies
Left-wing populism in South America
Types of socialism
Peronism
Cults of personality
Progressivism
Social democracy